Samrat Saheba (born 27 March 1981) is an Indian former cricketer. He played as a right-handed batsman and a right-arm medium-pace bowler who for Gujarat. He was born in Ahmedabad.

Saheba, who had previously played for the Gujarat team at Under-16, Under-19, and Under-22 level, made a single List A appearance for the side, during the 2002–03 season, against Mumbai. He did not bat in the match, but bowled three overs, conceding 27 runs.

References

External links
Samrat Saheba at Cricket Archive (subscription required)

1981 births
Living people
Indian cricketers
Gujarat cricketers